Lasiobelonium is a genus of fungi within the Hyaloscyphaceae family. The genus contains about 20 species.

References

External links
Lasiobelonium at Index Fungorum

Hyaloscyphaceae